MPVA can refer to 
 Ministry of Patriots' and Veterans' Affairs (South Korea)
 Paralyzed Veterans of America in Michigan, Minnesota, or other locations

 Mornington Peninsula Vignerons Association 
 Maintain a Position VFR and Advise
 Main Propellant Valve Actuator
 A type of thin film transistor liquid crystal display